Ĉ

Pemphredon inornata is a species of aphid wasp in the family Crabronidae. It is found in Europe and across the Palearctic (excluding China), North America, and Southern Asia.

References

Crabronidae
Articles created by Qbugbot
Insects described in 1824